Palermo - Milan One Way is a 1995 Italian crime-action film directed by Claudio Fragasso.

The film premiered at the 1995 Venice Film Festival. It won the David di Donatello Awards for best sound and for best producer. In 2007 a sequel film, Milano Palermo - Il ritorno, was released.

Cast 
 Giancarlo Giannini: Turi Arcangelo Leofonte
 Raoul Bova: Nino Di Venanzio
 Ricky Memphis: Remo Matteotti
 Romina Mondello: Chiara Leofonte
 Rosalinda Celentano: Paola Terenzi
 Francesco Benigno: Saro Ligresti
 Stefania Sandrelli: Franca Leofonte
 Tony Sperandeo: Marinnà
 Valerio Mastandrea: Tarcisio Proietti
 Paolo Calissano: Valerio Barreca
 Stefania Rocca: Maria Pia

References

External links

1995 films
1990s crime action films
Italian crime action films
Films directed by Claudio Fragasso
Films scored by Pino Donaggio
1990s Italian films